Nadejda Brânzan (29 August 1948 – 25 May 2020) was an infectious diseases physician from the Republic of Moldova, deputy of the Parliament in the Legislature 1990–1994.

Biography 
Nadejda Brânzan was born on August 29, 1948 in Rezina. She studied general medicine at the Institute of Medicine in Chișinău in 1966–1972. She worked as a doctor in Ștefan Vodă District until 1976, then a physician, head of department and deputy chief doctor at Rezina district hospital.

She devoted herself to politics in the 1990s. During the national liberation movement, she collected signatures to support the decree of the Romanian language as a state language. During the time she was a deputy, she was the chairman of the Committee on Women's Issues, Family Protection, Mother and Child, and also a member of the Presidium of Parliament. She contributed to the finalization of the Constitution of the Republic of Moldova and was among the signatories of the Declaration of Independence of the Republic of Moldova on 27 August 1991. She also voted to remove the CPSU out of the law.

External links 
 Cine au fost şi ce fac deputaţii primului Parlament din R. Moldova (1990-1994)?
 Declaraţia deputaţilor din primul Parlament
 Site-ul Parlamentului Republicii Moldova

1948 births
2020 deaths
Moldovan MPs 1990–1994
Popular Front of Moldova MPs
Moldovan female MPs
Moldovan infectious disease physicians
20th-century Moldovan women politicians
20th-century women physicians
People from Rezina District
Soviet infectious disease physicians